In algebra, the Yoneda product (named after Nobuo Yoneda) is the pairing between Ext groups of modules:

induced by

Specifically, for an element , thought of as an extension 
, 
and similarly 
, 
we form the Yoneda (cup) product 
.

We extend this definition to include  using the usual functoriality of the  groups.

Applications

Ext Algebras 
Given a commutative ring  and a module , the Yoneda product defines a product structure on the groups , where  is generally a non-commutative ring. This can be generalized to the case of sheaves of modules over a ringed space, or ringed topos.

Grothendieck duality 
In Grothendieck's duality theory of coherent sheaves on a projective scheme  of pure dimension  over an algebraically closed field , there is a pairingwhere  is the dualizing complex  and  given by the Yoneda pairing.

Deformation theory 
The Yoneda product is useful for understanding the obstructions to a deformation of maps of ringed topoi.

See also 
 Ext functor
 Derived category
Deformation theory
Kodaira–Spencer map

References

External links 
Universality of Ext functor using Yoneda extensions

Abstract algebra